The Anping Small Fort is a former fort in Anping District, Tainan, Taiwan.

History
The fort was built to prevent the invasion from British Empire during the Opium War. It was built by Yao Ying in 1844. In 1949, the Republic of China Armed Forces built a bunker at the fort. In 1990, the fort underwent renovation.

Architecture
The fort represents the latest period of Chinese old style.

See also
 List of tourist attractions in Taiwan
 Fort Zeelandia (Taiwan)

References

1841 establishments in Taiwan
Forts in Tainan